Dirba is a Sub-Division  and a Nagar Panchayat located Dirba tehsil in Sangrur district in the state of Punjab, India.
It is located on higher place and was also known as Thadde wala and with time; the name changed to Dirba.

Geography
It has an average elevation of 236 metres (774 feet).
 Dirba Assembly Constituency is represented by Harpal Singh Cheema who won election under ticket from Aam Aadmi Party .
Most of the residents in dirba rely on Agriculture directly or indirectly. Rice and Wheat are the only two crops which is grown in most farms. Farmers of Dirba and its nearby villages are shifting their focus to organic farming for providing better quality vegetables to consumers.

Education
Education in area is major issue . Although the area is present with too many schools in its locality ,  but the locality lacks in having a major university or college. Facing the issue , one tends to visit nearby cities like Patiala or Sangrur for higher education.

Sports
Dirba is known to have some of its famous kabaddi players all around the world like Khushi Duggan and Sandeep Luddar

References

Cities and towns in Sangrur district